Francis Hillman "Scrapper" Blackwell (February 21, 1903 – October 7, 1962) was an American blues guitarist and singer, best known as half of the guitar-piano duo he formed with Leroy Carr in the late 1920s and early 1930s. He was an acoustic single-note picker in the Chicago blues and Piedmont blues styles.

Career
Scrapper Blackwell was born in Syracuse, an unincorporated settlement in Darlington County, South Carolina. He was one of sixteen children of Payton and Elizabeth Blackwell, and is reported to have been part Cherokee.  He grew up in and spent most of his life in Indianapolis, Indiana, where he first relocated to at the age of three. He was given the nickname "Scrapper" by his grandmother, because of his fiery nature. His father played the fiddle, but Blackwell was a self-taught guitarist, building his first guitar out of a cigar box, wood and wire. He also learned to play the piano, occasionally performing professionally. By his teens, Blackwell was a part-time musician, traveling as far as Chicago. He was known for being withdrawn and hard to work with, but he established a rapport with the pianist Leroy Carr, whom he met in Indianapolis in the mid-1920s, and they had a productive working relationship. Carr convinced Blackwell to record with him for Vocalion Records in 1928; the result was "How Long, How Long Blues", the biggest blues hit of that year.

Blackwell also made solo recordings for Vocalion, including "Kokomo Blues", which was transformed into "Old Kokomo Blues" by Kokomo Arnold and later reworked as "Sweet Home Chicago" by Robert Johnson. Blackwell and Carr toured throughout the American Midwest and South between 1928 and 1935 as stars of the blues circuit, recording over 100 sides. "Prison Bound Blues" (1928), "Mean Mistreater Mama" (1934), and "Blues Before Sunrise" (1934) were popular tracks.

Blackwell made several solo excursions. A 1931 visit to Richmond, Indiana, to record at Gennett studios is noteworthy. Blackwell was dissatisfied with the lack of credit given his contributions with Carr; the situation was remedied by Vocalion's Mayo Williams after his 1931 breakaway: in all future recordings, Blackwell and Carr received equal songwriting credits and equal status in recording contracts. Blackwell's last recording session with Carr was in February 1935, for Bluebird Records. The session ended bitterly, as both musicians left the studio mid-session and on bad terms, stemming from payment disputes. Two months later Blackwell received a phone call informing him of Carr's death due to heavy drinking and nephritis. Blackwell soon recorded a tribute to his musical partner of seven years ("My Old Pal Blues"). After the death of Carr, Blackwell did a few recordings with piano player Dot Rice, without much success; the song "No Good Woman Blues" shows Blackwell as the singer. A short time later Blackwell retired from the music industry.

Blackwell returned to music in the late 1950s. He was recorded by Colin C. Pomroy in June 1958 (those recordings were released in 1967 on the Collector label). Soon afterwards he was recorded by Duncan P. Schiedt for Doug Dobell's 77 Records.  Blackwell was ready to resume his blues career, when he was shot and killed in a mugging in an Indianapolis alley, in October 1962 at the age of 59.  He is buried in New Crown Hill Cemetery, in Indianapolis.

See also
List of unsolved murders

Partial discography

Studio albums
Blues Before Sunrise (77 Records, 1960)
Mr. Scrapper's Blues (Bluesville, 1962)
The Blues of Brooks Berry & Scrapper Blackwell: My Heart Struck Sorrow (Bluesville, 1963)

Compilations
The Virtuoso Guitar of Scrapper Blackwell (Yazoo, 1970)
Naptown Blues 1929–1934, Leroy Carr and Scrapper Blackwell (Yazoo, 1973)
Blues That Make Me Cry (Agram, 1981)
Great Piano-Guitar Duets (1929–1935), Leroy Carr and Scrapper Blackwell (Old Tramp, 1987)
Leroy Carr & Scrapper Blackwell 1929–1935 (Best of Blues, 1989)
Scrapper Blackwell with Brooks Berry (Document, 1994)
Complete Recorded Works, Vols. 1 and 2 (Document, 1996)

References

 Swinton, Paul (2000). Audio CD liner notes. Bad Liquor Blues. KATCD162.

External links
 [ Scrapper Blackwell at allmusic]
 Illustrated Scrapper Blackwell discography

1903 births
1962 deaths
1962 murders in the United States
20th-century African-American musicians
20th-century American guitarists
20th-century American male musicians
20th-century American singers
American blues guitarists
American blues singers
American male guitarists
American murder victims
Burials at Crown Hill Cemetery
Chicago blues musicians
Country blues musicians
Deaths by firearm in Indiana
Decca Records artists
Gennett Records artists
Guitarists from Illinois
Male murder victims
Murdered African-American people
Musicians from Indianapolis
People murdered in Indiana
Piedmont blues musicians
Unsolved murders in the United States
Vocalion Records artists